The 2022 Lanka Premier League also known as Mazaplay LPL T20, for sponsorship reasons, was the third edition of the Lanka Premier League (LPL) Twenty20 franchise cricket tournament in Sri Lanka. It was originally scheduled to take place from 31 July to 21 August 2022 with Sri Lanka Cricket initially having promised to conduct LPL tournament targeting the August window. The ODI series between Pakistan and Sri Lanka were scrapped due to the hosting of this tournament. However, in July 2022, the tournament was postponed due to the economic crisis in Sri Lanka, with the aim to play it later in 2022. The tournament was later rescheduled to be held from 6 to 23 December 2022. The tournament also emphasized to promote and boost both the economy and international tourism.

Former Sri Lankan opener Sanath Jayasuriya, former Pakistani ace fast bowler Wasim Akram and former West Indian veteran batsman Viv Richards were appointed as brand ambassadors for the third edition of the tournament. Samantha Dodanwela was appointed as the tournament director replacing Ravin Wickramaratne with the latter decided to resign owing to personal reasons.

The tournament title logo was designed by Miyulika Weeramanthree, a mechanical engineering student from Kandy who was recognised by Sri Lanka Cricket during the LPL logo launch event which was held on 20 October 2022 and she was awarded a cash prize worth US$1000. Sri Lanka Cricket had initiated an open fan competition with the intention of finding the most attractive and suitable creative logo for the competition.

Ada Derana was officially selected as the television broadcasting partner for the event in Sri Lanka. The winners of the tournament were awarded US$100,000 while the runners-up would be awarded US$50,000.

On 23 December 2022, Jaffna Kings defeated Colombo Stars by 2 wickets in the final, to win their third successive LPL title.

Squads
The players' draft was held on 5 July 2022. However, some changes were later made to respective teams ever since the tournament was reshuffled from August to December. Players from England and Australia later withdrew from the tournament owing to the busy international schedule and 2022–23 Big Bash League season. However, most of the local players who were signed had been retained by the respective franchises and the franchises were allowed to pick new players without a draft ever since the change in the tournament schedule. Danushka Gunathilaka, while in Australia during the middle of the 2022 ICC Men's T20 World Cup, has been accused of sexual assault and has made himself unavailable for the tournament.

Venues
R. Premadasa Stadium in Colombo, Mahinda Rajapaksa International Cricket Stadium in Hambantota and Pallekele International Cricket Stadium in Kandy were selected as the venues.

Teams and standings

The top four teams qualify for the playoffs
 Advance to Qualifier 1
 Advance to Eliminator

League stage

The updated schedule was published on 14 October 2022.

Playoffs

Preliminary

Qualifier 1

Eliminator

Qualifier 2

Final

Statistics

Most runs

References

External links
 Series home at ESPN Cricinfo

Lanka Premier League
Lanka Premier League
2022 Lanka Premier League